Floyd William Nease II (born 1952) is the former Democratic Party Majority Leader of the Vermont House of Representatives.

Early life and education
Nease was born August 2, 1952, in Boston, the son of Stephen W. Nease and the grandson of Floyd W. Nease. He attended high school in Mount Vernon, Ohio, and earned an associate's degree from Mount Vernon Nazarene College before attending Eastern Nazarene College in Quincy, Massachusetts, for his baccalaureate education. He later earned a master's degree from Antioch University in 1986.

Career
Nease was the director of Laraway Youth and Family Services and served as a Vermont state representative from 2002 until his resignation in January 2011. He served as the house majority leader for two terms. He represented District 3: Lamoille County, Vermont.

Notes and references

External links
Vermont Public Radio: Patti Komline & Floyd Nease on legislative priorities, Monday March 16, 2009

Eastern Nazarene College alumni
Mount Vernon Nazarene University alumni
Politicians from Boston
1952 births
Living people
Antioch University alumni
Members of the Vermont House of Representatives
Majority leaders of the Vermont House of Representatives